The Tropical Airplay chart (formerly known as Tropical/Salsa and Tropical Songs) is a record chart published by Billboard magazine introduced in 1994. The first number-one song on the chart was "Quien Eres Tu" by Luis Enrique. Originally, rankings on the chart were determined by the amount of airplay a song received on radio stations that primarily played tropical music, namely music originating from the Spanish-speaking areas of the Caribbean such as salsa, merengue, bachata, cumbia, vallenato, and tropical fusions. Any song, regardless of its genre, was eligible for the chart if it received enough airplay from the panel of tropical music radio stations being monitored.

Billboard revised the methodology of the chart in January 2017. Since January 21, 2017, the Tropical Airplay chart measures airplay based on audience impressions of tropical music songs over approximately 140 Latin music radio stations. Audience impressions are based on not only how often a song is played as monitored by Nielsen BDS but the ratings of the monitored stations at such time the songs are being played as measured by Nielsen Audio. With the change, the chart was reduced from a list of the top 40 songs to 25.
The current number one song is "La Bachata" by Manuel Turizo.

Records

Artist with the most number-one songs

Artists with the most top-ten hits

Songs with the most weeks at number one

Top-ten songs of all-time (1994–2018)
In 2017, Billboard magazine compiled a ranking of the 20 best-performing songs on the chart since its inception in 1994. The chart is based on the most weeks the song spent on top of the chart. For songs with the same number of weeks at number one, they are ranked them by most weeks in the top ten, followed by most total weeks on the chart. The top 20 was updated the following year.

Tropical Airplay number-one songs of the year
1995: "Te Conozco Bien" by Marc Anthony
1996: "Ironía" by Frankie Ruiz
1997: "Inolvidable" by Frankie Negrón
1998: "Suavemente" by Elvis Crespo
1999: "El Niágara en Bicicleta" by Juan Luis Guerra
2000: "A Puro Dolor" by Son by Four
2001: "Me Da Lo Mismo" by Víctor Manuelle
2002: "La Agarro Bajando" by Gilberto Santa Rosa
2003: "Sedúceme" by La India
2004: "Tengo Ganas" by Víctor Manuelle
2005: "Lo Que Pasó, Pasó by Daddy Yankee
2006: "Qué Precio Tiene el Cielo" by Marc Anthony
2007: "Mi Corazoncito" by Aventura
2008: "Te Quiero" by Flex
2009: "Por un Segundo" by Aventura
2010: "Dile al Amor" by Aventura
2011: "Danza Kuduro" by Don Omar featuring Lucenzo
2012: "Incondicional" by Prince Royce
2013: "Vivir Mi Vida" by Marc Anthony

Decade-end charts
2000s: "Qué Precio Tiene el Cielo" by Marc Anthony

See also
Latin Airplay
Tropical Albums
Tropical music

References

External links
Current Billboard Tropical Airplay 

Billboard charts